Serge Mesonès (15 March 1948 – 1 November 2001) was a French footballer who played as a midfielder.

Career
Mesonès played professional football for AS Nancy and AJ Auxerre, the club he helped reach the final of the 1978–79 Coupe de France.

After he retired from playing football, Mesonès became a sports journalist and a member of the French Communist Party.

Personal
On 1 November 2001, Mesonès died in Aubin, Aveyron at the age of 53.

References

External links
Profile at Afterfoot.fr

1948 births
2001 deaths
Association football midfielders
French footballers
AJ Auxerre players
AS Nancy Lorraine players
LB Châteauroux players
AS Moulins players
French Communist Party members